Sir David Paton Cuthbertson,  CBE, FRSE (9 May 1900 – 15 April 1989) was a Scottish physician, biochemist, medical researcher and nutritionist who was a leading authority on metabolism. The Rowett Research Institute became one of the world's leading centres for animal nutrition research under Cuthbertson's leadership (1945–65).

Life

David Cuthbertson was born in Kilmarnock the son of John Cuthbertson FRSE (1859-1933) a teacher in the fields of both mining and agriculture. David was educated at Kilmarnock Academy. He served in the Royal Scots Fusiliers during the First World War. This delayed his education and he then studied Medicine at Glasgow University graduating MB ChB in 1926.

Cuthbertson served on several research and scientific committees, including secondment to the Medical Research Council in 1943, and served as Vice-President of  the Royal Society of Edinburgh from 1959–60.

In his early research, in 1936, Cuthbertson observed a loss of nitrogen (urea) in fracture patients, later referred to as surgical stress. In this he was assisted by Hamish Munro.

He was Director of the Rowett Research Institute from 1945 to 1965.

He was awarded several honorary doctorates: DSc from Rutgers University; LLD from Glasgow University; LLD from Aberdeen University; and Dhc from Zagreb University. In 1949 he was elected a Fellow of the Royal Society of Edinburgh. His proposers were James Norman Davidson, Robert Garry, Ernest Cruickshank, and Donald McArthur. He served as the Society's Vice President from 1959 to 1960.

He died on 15 April 1989, in Troon in Ayrshire.

Family

He was married to Jean Telfer (d.1987). His son was the actor Iain Cuthbertson (1930-2009).

References

1900 births
1989 deaths
People from Kilmarnock
People educated at Kilmarnock Academy
Alumni of the University of Glasgow
Academics of the University of Glasgow
Fellows of the Royal Society of Edinburgh
Fellows of the Royal College of Physicians of Edinburgh
Fellows of the Royal College of Physicians and Surgeons of Glasgow
Fellows of the Royal College of Surgeons of Edinburgh
20th-century Scottish medical doctors
Scottish pathologists
Scottish biochemists
British nutritionists
British medical researchers
Scottish knights
Commanders of the Order of the British Empire
Royal Scots Fusiliers soldiers
British Army personnel of World War I